is a Japanese jockey who is represented by the Japan Racing Association. He won the 2008 JRA Award for Newcomer Jockey with the Most Victories after winning 91 races in a single year as a rookie jockey, surpassing Yutaka Take's previous record of 69 victories.

Miura has also been awarded the 2014 Hokkaido Horse Racing Press Club Award.

References

External links
 

Japanese jockeys
1989 births
Living people
People from Nerima